Year 1410 (MCDX) was a common year starting on Wednesday (link will display the full calendar) of the Julian calendar.

Events 
 January–December 
 March 25 – The first of the Yongle Emperor's campaigns against the Mongols is launched, leading to the fall of Öljei Temür Khan.
 March 29 – The Aragonese capture Oristano, capital of the Giudicato di Arborea in Sardinia.
 June 15 – Ottoman Interregnum: Süleyman Çelebi defeats his brother Musa Çelebi outside the Byzantine capital, Constantinople.
 July 11 – Ottoman Interregnum: Süleyman Çelebi defeats his brother Musa Çelebi outside the Ottoman capital, Edirne.
 July 15 – Battle of Grunwald (Žalgiris), also known as Battle of Tannenberg:  Polish and Lithuanian forces under cousins Jogaila and Vytautas the Great decisively defeat the forces of the Teutonic Knights, whose power is broken.

 Date unknown 
 Jan Hus is excommunicated by the Archbishop of Prague.
 Antipope John XXIII is elected.
 Construction begins on Castle Woerden in the Netherlands.
 The Prague Astronomical Clock (also known as Prague Orloj) is built by Mikuláš of Kadaň and Jan Šindel in Prague, the capital of the Czech Republic.

Births 
 January 30 – William Calthorpe, English knight (d. 1494)
 July 14 – Arnold, Duke of Guelders, Duke of Guelders (1423–1465 and 1471–1473) (d. 1473)
 August 1 – John IV, Count of Nassau-Siegen (1442–1475) (d. 1475)
 date unknown
 Masuccio Salernitano, Italian poet (d. 1475)
 William Sinclair, 1st Earl of Caithness (d. 1484)
 probable
 Johannes Ockeghem, Dutch composer (d. 1497)
 Ólöf Loftsdóttir, politically active Icelandic woman (d. 1479)
 Conrad Paumann, German organist and composer (d. 1473)
 Vecchietta, Sienese painter, sculptor and architect (d. 1480)

Deaths 
 March 5 – Matthew of Kraków, Polish reformer (b. 1335)
 March 16 – John Beaufort, 1st Earl of Somerset (b. 1373)
 May 3 – Antipope Alexander V, (b. 1339)
 May 18 – Rupert of Germany, Count Palatine of the Rhine (b. 1352)
 May 31 – Martin of Aragon (b. 1356)
 July 15 – Ulrich von Jungingen, German Grand Master of the Teutonic Knights (in battle) (b. 1360)
 August – Matthew I of Constantinople
 August 10 – Louis II, Duke of Bourbon (b. 1337)
 date unknown 
 Margareta Dume, influential Swedish-Finnish noble
 John Badby, English martyr

References